The American University of Integrative Sciences (AUIS), is a private for-profit offshore medical school with a single campus located in Barbados. Founded in 1999, it was formerly known as the University of Sint Eustatius School of Medicine (USESOM). For a period, the school was based in Sint Maarten, where it was taken over by IEMR LLC, a US-based company. Since October 2017, AUIS has operated in Barbados, and it is currently a candidate for accreditation by the Caribbean Accreditation Authority for Education in Medicine and other Health Professions (CAAM-HP).

History 
The school was founded in 1999 as the University of Sint Eustatius School of Medicine, by a group of educators and administrators including Dr. David Gill, former president of St. Christopher's College of Medicine.

With the island of Sint Eustatius becoming part of the Caribbean Netherlands in 2010, the University of Sint Eustatius School of Medicine was required to seek accreditation from the Accreditation Organisation of the Netherlands and Flanders (NVAO). In November 2008, the university's doctor of medicine (M.D.) program was assessed with unsatisfactory results. In 2011, the school was given a two-year extension, but failed to attain NVAO accreditation by the deadline of September 2013. As a result, the University of Sint Eustatius was not allowed to continue operating in the Caribbean Netherlands. At the time, the school was run by Michael Knopf and his daughter, Irene Weinstein.

In September 2013, the school relocated operations to Cole Bay on the Caribbean island of Sint Maarten, and eventually went bankrupt, with a debt of $700,000. By September 2014, it was owned and operated by IEMR, LLC, led by CEO Milo Pinckney, and changed its name to the American University of Integrative Sciences, Sint Maarten School of Medicine (AUIS). According to an AUIS press release, Pinckney appointed Renu Agnihotri, M.D., a former professor of molecular medicine, as president of AUIS. A journal article in BMC Medical Education noted that AUIS St. Maarten School of Medicine marketed itself on its website as providing an alternative for pre-med students who might otherwise "miss out" on their dream of becoming a physician, due to the competitiveness of American and Canadian medical schools.

In March 2017, the AUIS went public with its dispute with Education Minister Silveria Jacobs, accusing her of "stonewalling" and refusing to meet with Pinckney to resolve their differences. According to Agnihotri, the Sint Maarten Ministry of Education had refused to simply change the name on its charter agreement from USESOM to AUIS; instead, it sent AUIS a new charter agreement with different conditions. Agnihotri also criticized Jacobs for discrediting AUIS by stating that it was unaccredited, since the school was in the process of seeking accreditation with the ACCM (Accreditation Commission of Colleges of Medicine). Pinckney told the Today newspaper that he believed a competitor, American University of the Caribbean, had influenced the government to create "obstacles" making it difficult for AUIS to do business in St. Maarten.

By October 2017, the American University of Integrative Sciences had relocated to Barbados.

Accreditation 
As of February 2021, the American University of Integrative Sciences is an applicant for "Candidacy status " as a preliminary step for accreditation by the CAAM-HP (Caribbean Accreditation Authority for Education in Medicine and other Health Professions), pending a full site visit.

Curriculum

Premedical program
AUIS, as of October 2018, has a Bachelors Of Medical Sciences program (BMsc) which will enable students to complete their first 90 prerequisite credit hours with the university before moving into their Basic Sciences program. This degree is awarded upon successful completion of 142 course credits. As of now, there are 5 students in the program.

Doctor of Medicine program

The MD program at AUIS is divided into eleven total semesters, consisting of three semesters per year. Semesters 1-4(16 months) are basic sciences semesters that are completed at the university's Barbados campus and semester 5 is a professor led USMLE Step 1 review course (fundamental of clinical medicine) that is completed at the university campus in Atlanta, Georgia. Our curriculum incorporates (Introduction to Clinical Medicine coursework) throughout all 5 semestersAnd must pass The NBME Comprehensive Basic Science Examination( CBSE) Within allotted time and if not successful must keep retaking to ensure quality USMLE Step 1 Pass rate and then register and take the USMLE Step 1 within 2 semesters after completion of basic sciences and CBSE, failure to do so results in retaking the exam and academic probation or administrative withdrawal, No student can begin or access clinical clerkships until both CBSE And USMLE Step 1 are successfully passed with results in excessive time off from the program and can negatively impact ECFMG Certification for the student, once exams are cleared and adequate documentation status of B1 visa for international and Canadian students as every student is solely responsible for their documentation status, AUIS is not responsible for access for a visa any student unable to get a documentation status will not be able to access clerkships therefore cannot complete the MD Program . And deposits and financial obligation met. Students Then Proceed to the remaining six semesters (24 months) are clinical rotations, composed of core and elective rotations that primarily take place in hospitals in the United States then must pass the USMLE Step 2 CK And NBME Comprehensive Clinical Science Examination( CCSE) And The NBME Clinical Science Subject Examinations with allotted time can proceed to gain MD and graduate out of the MD Program. AUIS focuses on a curriculum which includes traditional Western Medicine.

Residency placements and training appointments
Graduates from the American University of Integrated Sciences have successfully secured residency placements in the United States as well as Canada. Graduates from 2014- 2020 matched into Family Medicine, Internal Medicine, Psychiatry and other specialties.

See also
 Offshore medical school
 International medical graduate
 List of medical schools in the Caribbean

References

External links
 Official website

Education in Sint Eustatius
Medical schools in the Caribbean
Universities and colleges in Sint Maarten
Schools of medicine in Sint Maarten
Educational institutions established in 1999
1999 establishments in Georgia (U.S. state)
Medical schools in Barbados